A wangler is one who resorts to trickery or devious methods to obtain their goals. One might find himself classified as a wangler if they were to manipulate information to obtain a job.

Etymology
The term has been historically attributed to a British printer's slang term meaning "fake by manipulation" in 1888. Wangle may be an alteration of waggle or the dialectic 'wankle' meaning "unsteady or fickle," which descends from the Old English 'wancol'. If this is true, wangle would share an etymological heritage with the modern word 'wench.'

Harry Potter and resurgence
Author J.K. Rowling used the word in the third installment of her Harry Potter novel, The Prisoner of Azkaban, leading to a growing use of the otherwise seldom heard term.

References